Non-Inscrits (abbreviated NI; also non-attached members, abbreviated NA) are Members of the European Parliament (MEP) who do not belong to one of the recognised political groups.

These MEPs may be members of a national party, or of a European political party, but for a political grouping to be formed in the European Parliament there need to be 25 MEPs from seven different countries. Being part of a group grants access to state funds and committee seats, but the group members must be ideologically tied. Groups of convenience, such as the Technical Group of Independents, previously existed, but are no longer allowed, and the minimum requirements for group formation have been raised, forcing parties and MEPs without ideological similarity to already existing groupings to sit as non-inscrits. Whilst some MEPs who sit as non-inscrits may have similar views and express intention to form new groupings between themselves in the future, non-inscrits as a whole have no specific ties to each other other than their mutual lack of a political grouping.

MEPs

Ninth European Parliament (2019–2024) 

Prior to the United Kingdom's withdrawal from the EU on 31 January 2020, there were 30 British MEPs who were Non-Inscrits: 29 members of the Brexit Party and 1 member of the Democratic Unionist Party.

Eighth Parliament (2014–2019)
Source:

The number of Non-Inscrits rose temporarily from 48 at the beginning of the term to 100 between 16 and 20 October 2014 when the EFDD group dissolved following the departure of Latvian MEP Iveta Grigule. The EFDD group was restored when Robert Iwaszkiewicz (KNP, Poland) decided to join it.

On 15 June 2015, 35 Non-Inscrits MEPs and a former EFDD member (Janice Atkinson, excluded from UKIP) formed a new group, named "Europe of Nations and Freedom" (ENF), around Marine Le Pen (FN) and Marcel de Graaff (PVV), later joined on 24 June 2015 by Aymeric Chauprade. The number of Non-Inscrits then fell to 14 on 22 July 2015, when Juan Fernando López Aguilar reintegrated S&D. Aymeric Chauprade left ENF on 9 November 2015. Marcus Pretzell was expelled from ECR before joining the ENF in May 2016, bringing the number of Non-Inscrits to 15. From May 2016 to May 2017 Renato Soru was expelled from S&D after being sentenced for tax evasion. When Steven Woolfe and Diane James left EFDD in October and November 2016 and Alessandra Mussolini left EPP during twelve days in November–December 2016 the number of Non-Inscrits grew to 19 before coming back to 18. Jacek Saryusz-Wolski was expelled from the EPP in March 2017.

Previous members

Seventh Parliament (2009–2014)

Sixth Parliament (2004–2009)
In the 6th European Parliament 23 right-wing NIs briefly formed the Identity, Tradition, Sovereignty group at the start of 2007, but it collapsed on 14 November 2007 due to internal disagreements.

Fifth Parliament (1999–2004)

Fourth Parliament (1994–1999)

Third Parliament (1989–1994)

Second Parliament (1984–1989)

First Parliament (1979–1984)

See also
Independent politician
Mixed Group

Notes

References

External links 
 

European Parliament party groups